Mara Ferreira Leão (born 26 July 1991 Sabinopolis) is a Brazilian volleyball player who has represented her country in  world championships. She is a member of the Sesi Vôlei Bauru club and a member of the Brazil women's national volleyball team. She was part of the Brazil national indoor volleyball team at the 2017 FIVB Volleyball World Grand Prix, the 2018 FIVB Volleyball Women's Nations League, and the 2016 Montreux Volley Masters.

Clubs 

  Rio de Janeiro (2008–2013)
  São Caetano (2013–2015)
  Minas Tênis Clube (2015–2019)
  Osasco Audax (2019–2020)
  Sesi Vôlei Bauru (2020–)

Awards

Individuals
 2016–17 Brazilian Superliga – "Best Blocker"
 2019 South American Championship – "Best Middle Blocker"

Clubs
 2010–11 Brazilian Superliga –  Champion, with Rio de Janeiro
 2012–13 Brazilian Superliga –  Champion, with Rio de Janeiro
 2018–19 Brazilian Superliga –  Champion, with Minas Tênis Clube
 2009 South American Club Championship –  Runner-up, with Rio de Janeiro
 2013 South American Club Championship –  Champion, with Rio de Janeiro
 2018 South American Club Championship –  Champion, with Minas Tênis Clube
 2019 South American Club Championship –  Champion, with Minas Tênis Clube
 2018 FIVB Club World Championship –  Runner-up, with Minas Tênis Clube

References

External links 

 FIVB profile

Brazilian women's volleyball players
1991 births
Living people
Middle blockers
21st-century Brazilian women